Storm of Love may refer to

 Storm of Love, a song on the album Together Again (Buck Owens album) 1964, covered by various artists, including Rodney Crowell on Jewel of the South 1995
 Sturm der Liebe, a German TV soap opera
 Ai no Arashi (愛の嵐) List of Strawberry Panic episodes
 Storm of Love, TV show of the Pentecostal Igreja Universal do Reino de Deus (IURD), Brazil
 Âsifah min al-houbb, 1961 film by Hussein Helmi al-Mouhandès, Egypt
 Storm of Love (film), a 1929 German silent film